Holcomb Creek Falls, located in the Chattooga River Ranger District of the Chattahoochee National Forest in Rabun County, Georgia, drop 120 feet over shoals.  There is 1.75 mile loop hiking trail that provides access to both Holcomb Creek Falls and nearby Ammons Creek Falls.  A wooden observation deck has been built to allow views of the waterfall.

Directions: From Clayton, Georgia take Warwoman Road east for 10 miles. Turn left onto Hale Ridge Road (Forest Service Road 7) for 7 miles until it intersects Overflow Road (Forest Service Road 86).

External links
Photographs of Holcomb Creek Falls from the Highlands Newspaper Internet Directory

Waterfalls of Georgia (U.S. state)
Protected areas of Rabun County, Georgia
Chattahoochee-Oconee National Forest
Waterfalls of Rabun County, Georgia